Leopold Łabędź (22 January 1920 – 22 March 1993) was an anti-communist Anglo-Polish commentator on the Soviet Union.

Łabędź was born to a Polish Jewish doctor in Russia. The family soon returned to Warsaw and the young Łabędź decided to follow his father into the medical profession. He studied medicine in Paris. In 1939, he fled to the Soviet zone of occupation and was imprisoned by the Soviets in the Gulag.

He left the Soviet Union in 1942 as part of the Polish Army led by General Władysław Anders. After the war he studied at Bologna University before settling in London, where he studied at the London School of Economics. Strongly anti-communist, Łabędź edited Survey journal and headed the London office of Committee for the Defense of Workers known by its Polish abbreviation as KOR.

Łabędź often campaigned for the Solidarity union in Poland, and for political prisoners in the Soviet Union. Łabędź was one of Aleksandr Solzhenitsyn's principal champions in the West and often defended the Russian writer against the charge of anti-semitism.

Bibliography

 
Polycentrism : the new factor in international communism  edited by Walter Laqueur and Leopold Labedz, New York : Praeger, 1962.
Revisionism : essays on the history of Marxist ideas edited by L. Labedz, London : G. Allen and Unwin, 1962.
Literature and revolution in Soviet Russia, 1917-62, a symposium, edited by Max Hayward and Leopold Labedz, London, Oxford University Press, 1963.
The Sino-Soviet conflict : eleven radio discussions by L. Labedz & George Urban, London : Bodley Head, 1965, 1964.
International communism after Khrushchev edited by Leopold Labedz Cambridge, M.I.T. Press 1965.
The State of Soviet Studies edited by Walter Laqueur and Leopold Labedz, Cambridge, Mass., M.I.T. Press 1965.
Solzhenitsyn : a documentary record Harmondsworth, Middlesex, England; Baltimore : Penguin, 1974. 
"Chomsky Revisited", Encounter, July 1980, pp. 28–35.
The use and abuse of Sovietology edited by Melvin J. Lasky New Brunswick, N.J., U.S.A. : Transaction Publishers, 1989.
Critical studies, reviews and biography
 
 Shils, Edward, Portraits : A Gallery of Intellectuals, University Of Chicago Press 1997.

References

Shils, Edward Portraits : A Gallery of Intellectuals, University Of Chicago Press 1997.

1920 births
1993 deaths
Soviet Jews
Jewish historians
Polish deportees to Soviet Union
20th-century British historians
Polish expatriates in the Soviet Union
Polish expatriates in France
Polish expatriates in Italy
Polish emigrants to the United Kingdom